Novočėbė is a village in Kėdainiai district municipality, in Kaunas County, central Lithuania. It is located by the Kėdainiai city southern limit, nearby road junction (Jonava-Šeduva and Aristava-Kėdainiai-Cinkiškiai routes). According to the 2011 census, the village has a population of 1 inhabitant.

Demography

References

Villages in Kaunas County
Kėdainiai District Municipality